Poqomam may refer to:
 Poqomam people, an ethnic subgroup of the Maya
 Poqomam language, the language spoken by that people

Language and nationality disambiguation pages